Asterina is a large genus of fungi in the Asterinaceae family. The relationship of this taxon to other taxa within the class is unknown (incertae sedis), and it has not yet been placed with certainty into any order. The genus was circumscribed by French mycologist Joseph-Henri Léveillé in 1845.

Species

Asterina adeniicola
Asterina advenula
Asterina aglaiae
Asterina alchorneae
Asterina alchorneicola
Asterina aporosae
Asterina aterrima
Asterina blanda
Asterina buettneriae
Asterina bullata
Asterina cannonii
Asterina canthii-dicocci
Asterina canthiigena
Asterina ceropegiae
Asterina champereiicola
Asterina congesta
Asterina congregata
Asterina connectilis
Asterina consobrina
Asterina corallopoda
Asterina coriacella
Asterina daphniphyllicola
Asterina delitescens
Asterina deviata
Asterina dhivaharanii
Asterina dilabens
Asterina dinghuensis
Asterina ditissima
Asterina effusa
Asterina emciciana
Asterina enicostemmatis
Asterina erebia
Asterina euryae
Asterina flacourtiae
Asterina fragillissima
Asterina funtumiae
Asterina gaiadendricola
Asterina gamsii
Asterina geniostomatis
Asterina girardiniae
Asterina glycosmidigena
Asterina glycosmidis
Asterina glyptopetali
Asterina guaranitica
Asterina gymnemae
Asterina hainanensis
Asterina hederae
Asterina himantia
Asterina hydrocotyles
Asterina hyptidicola
Asterina indecora
Asterina jahnii
Asterina jasmini
Asterina lauracearum
Asterina lawsoniae
Asterina laxiuscula
Asterina ligustricola
Asterina lobulifera
Asterina loranthigena
Asterina madikeriensis
Asterina mahoniae
Asterina malloti-apeltae
Asterina manihotis
Asterina melastomatis
Asterina miliusae
Asterina mimusopsidicola
Asterina myrsinacearum
Asterina nodulosa
Asterina nyanzae
Asterina orbicularis
Asterina oreocnidegena
Asterina orthosticha
Asterina parsonsiae
Asterina phoebeicola
Asterina phoebes
Asterina phoradendricola
Asterina phyllanthigena
Asterina plectranthi
Asterina polygalae
Asterina pouzolziae
Asterina prataprajii
Asterina psychotriicola
Asterina pulchella
Asterina quarta
Asterina ramonensis
Asterina randiae-benthamianae
Asterina rhodomyrti
Asterina sarcandrae
Asterina sawadai
Asterina schimae
Asterina schlegeliae
Asterina scleropyri
Asterina scruposa
Asterina solanicola
Asterina sponiae
Asterina stipitipodia
Asterina sublibera
Asterina suttonii
Asterina systema-solare
Asterina talacauveriana
Asterina tenella
Asterina tetracericola
Asterina tetrazygiicola
Asterina toddaliicola
Asterina torulosa
Asterina toxocarpi
Asterina tylophorae-indicae
Asterina veronicae
Asterina viburni

References

Asterinaceae
Taxa named by Joseph-Henri Léveillé
Taxa described in 1845